Polco is a village within the Chamical Department of La Rioja Province in northwestern Argentina.

References

Populated places in La Rioja Province, Argentina